Individuals and events related to 1921 in the Civil War-era Russia.

Incumbents

Lists
 9th Politburo, the 9th Secretariat and the 9th Orgburo of the Russian Communist Party (Bolsheviks) (5 April 1920  16 March 1921).
 10th Politburo and the 10th Secretariat of the Russian Communist Party (Bolsheviks) (16 March 1921  2 April 1922).
 Central Auditing Commission compositions elected by the 8th, 10th, 13th, 14th and 15th Congress of the All-Union Communist Party (Bolsheviks)
 Central Committee elected by the 9th Congress of the Russian Communist Party (Bolsheviks) (5 April 1920  16 March 1921).
 Central Committee elected by the 10th Congress of the Russian Communist Party (Bolsheviks) (16 March 1921  2 April 1922).

Central Committee members

 Andrey Andreyevich Andreyev
 Alexander Beloborodov
 Nikolai Bukharin
 Vlas Chubar
 Felix Dzerzhinsky
 Mikhail Frunze
 Sergey Gusev
 Mikhail Kalinin
 Lev Kamenev
 Sergey Kirov
 Aleksei Kiselyov (politician)
 Nikolay Komarov (politician)
 Nikolay Krestinsky
 Ivan Kutuzov
 Valerian Kuybyshev
 Vladimir Lenin
 Vasily Mikhailov
 Vladimir Milyutin
 Vyacheslav Molotov
 Matvei Muranov
 Viktor Nogin
 Grigol Ordzhonikidze
 Valerian Osinsky
 Grigory Petrovsky
 Osip Piatnitsky
 Yevgeni Preobrazhensky
 Karl Radek
 Christian Rakovsky
 Jānis Rudzutaks
 Alexei Rykov
 Georgy Safarov
 Vasily Schmidt
 Leonid Serebryakov
 Fyodor Sergeyev
 Alexander Shliapnikov
 Ivar Smilga
 Ivan Smirnov (politician)
 Joseph Stalin
 Pēteris Stučka
 Daniil Sulimov
 Mikhail Tomsky
 Leon Trotsky
 Ivan Tuntul
 Nikolai Uglanov
 Kliment Voroshilov
 Yemelyan Yaroslavsky
 Pyotr Zalutsky
 Isaak Zelensky
 Grigory Zinoviev

Establishments

 Art Culture Museum
 Communist University of the National Minorities of the West
 Communist University of the Toilers of the East
 FSB Academy
 Gosplan
 Institute of Red Professors
 Krasnaya Nov
 Moscow Institute of Oriental Studies 
 Mountain Autonomous Soviet Socialist Republic
 Museum of Artistic Culture
 Na Smenu!
 Natalya Sats Musical Theater
 New Economic Policy
 Nikolai M. Knipovich Polar Research Institute of Marine Fisheries and Oceanography
 Poison laboratory of the Soviet secret services
 Prodnalog
 Russian Bureau of Philately
 Serbsky Center
 Soviet ruble
 FC Spartak Vladikavkaz
 Tersk Stud
 Trud (Russian newspaper)
 Tuvan People's Revolutionary Army
 Zhas Alash

Disestablishments

 Alexandrovsky Uyezd
 Kungursky Uyezd
 Minsk Governorate
 Moscow Society of Philatelists and Collectors
 Sretensk prisoner of war camp
 Sukhum Okrug
 Vestnik Teatra
 War communism
 Zangezur Uyezd

Events

 10th Russian Communist Party Congress
 1921 Mari wildfires
 1921 Russian Supreme Soviet election
 1921–22 famine in Tatarstan
 5×5=25
 Anglo-Soviet Trade Agreement
 Central Committee of the 10th Congress
 Far Eastern Front in the Russian Civil War
 Kronstadt rebellion
 New Economic Policy
 Peace of Riga
 Peasant rebellion of Sorokino
 Russian famine of 1921–22
 Russo-Persian Treaty of Friendship (1921)
 Tambov Rebellion
 Trade-union debate (Russia)
 Treaty of Kars
 Treaty of Moscow (1921)
 War communism
 Yakut revolt

Births
 Andrei Sakharov

Deaths
 Micha Josef Berdyczewski
 Alexander Blok
 Nikolay Gumilyov
 Vladimir Korolenko
 Peter Kropotkin
 Dmitri Parsky
 Liya Shakirova

See also
 Communist Party of the Soviet Union
 Government of the Soviet Union
 Politics of the Soviet Union
 Timeline of Russian history

Notes

References

Further reading

External links
 
 
 

 
Years of the 20th century in Russia